The 2018 World Lacrosse Championship was the 13th edition of the international men's field lacrosse tournament for national teams organized by the Federation of International Lacrosse (FIL). As many as 50 countries were expected to compete in the tournament; with the official total coming in at 46, which made the 2018 WLC the largest of all-time. The games were held in Netanya, Israel on 12–21 July 2018. The United States won the tournament, its 10th championship in the history of the event.

Hosting 
Manchester, England was originally selected to host the tournament, but withdrew in May 2017. Instead, the championships took place in Netanya, Israel between 12 and 21 July 2018. This was the first World Lacrosse Championship played outside of the United States, Canada, England, or Australia.

Tournament
On Thursday, 12 July, the Opening Ceremony and first games were held at Netanya Stadium, a 13,610-seat multi-use stadium which opened in 2012. It served as a home field for the 2013 UEFA European Under-21 Championship and features 36 luxury suites, a VIP seating area, and a modern press box. The stadium serves as the home field of Maccabi Netanya FC, as well as the temporary home of Maccabi Tel Aviv FC and Hapoel Ra'anana A.F.C.

From Friday, 13 July to Saturday, 21 July, the tournament games will be played at Wingate Institute. Located on 50 hectares (125 acres), the Wingate Institute serves as Israel's National Centre for Physical Education and Sport. The campus doubles as both the State of Israel's primary university for the development of physical education teachers, as well as the nation's official training centre for national teams, the Israel Olympic Team, and national and international sports science conferences. The campus hosts the Israel Olympiada annually and the Maccabiah Games every four years. Wingate Stadium also serves as the home field for the Israel National Rugby Team.

Participating nations 
48 teams initially entered the tournament. They were drawn into 14 groups in March 2018. However Bulgaria and Haiti later withdrew leaving just 46 teams. The world ranking of the teams based on their performance in the 2014 edition is also displayed. The top 6 teams in the 2014 edition are drawn into the Blue Division while the rest of the teams were drawn into the other divisions.

Schedule 
 Wednesday, 11 July – Opening game (Hong Kong vs. Luxembourg)
 Thursday, 12 July – Opening ceremony and pool play
 Friday, 13 July to Tuesday, 17 July – pool play and play-Ins
 Wednesday, 18 July – Quarterfinals
 Thursday, 19 July – Semifinals
 Friday, 20 July – Final placement games (bronze-medal game to 46th place)
 Saturday, 21 July – Gold-medal game

Pool play

Blue Division

Red Division

White Division

Green Division

Yellow Division

Orange Division

Plum Division

Turquoise Division

Grey Division

Gold Division

Bronze Division

Tan Division

Purple Division

Olive Division

Play-in games

Upper bracket

The upper bracket includes the 13 first-place finishers from each division as well as the second-place finisher of the white division. These teams can still win the world championship.

!colspan="3"|First round

|-
!colspan="3"|Second round

|-
!colspan="3"|Third round

|}

Middle bracket

!colspan="3"|First round

|-
!colspan="3"|Second round

|-
| colspan="3" |
|-

|-
!colspan="3"|Third round

|-
| colspan="3" |
|-

|}

Lower bracket

!colspan="3"|First round

|-
!colspan="3"|Second round

|-
| colspan="3" |
|-

|-
!colspan="3"|Third round

|-
| colspan="3" |
|-

|-
|}

Final placement round

Championship bracket

1st to 4th place

Classification brackets

5th to 8th place

9th to 12th place

13th to 16th place

17th to 20th place

21st to 24th place

25th to 28th place

29th to 32nd place

33rd to 36th place

37th to 40th place

41st to 44th place

45th to 46th place

2018 World Lacrosse Festival 
Alongside the WLC, youth and adult lacrosse teams from around the world will participate in the 2018 World Lacrosse Festival at Shefayim Soccer Complex.

Final standings

Awards
The following awards were given out at the end of the tournament.

MVP:  Michael Ehrhardt  
Outstanding Attackman:  Curtis Dickson 
Outstanding Midfielder:  Tom Schreiber  
Outstanding Defenseman:  Michael Ehrhardt  
Outstanding Goalie:  Dillon Ward

All-World Team

References

External links
 Federation of International Lacrosse
 Official website

2018
World Lacrosse Championship
World Lacrosse